Prashant Damle (born 5 April 1961)  is a Marathi actor, comedian who has acted in numerous Marathi drama, movie and Soap opera over 35 years. He has been associated with Marathi theatre since 1983 and till date has performed in 27 different plays and a variety of hundreds of roles. Damle is widely recognized as the biggest ultimate superstar of Marathi theatre.

In the journey of 35 years of performing arts, he has been honored with many prestigious awards. To date he has 5 Limca Book of Records in his name. He has also performed in 37 Marathi Feature Films and 24 Marathi serials. On 6th November 2022, his performance in Eka Lagnachi Pudhchi Goshta marked his career's 12,500th show, a record.

Career
After the first few stage performances during his school years and college years he got an opportunity to act in the Marathi play named "Tur Tur". That proved to be a major breakthrough for him and thus he ventured into the commercial Marathi theater. He proved his excellence in comedy. Then followed the play "Moruchi Mavshi". During that period of struggle Mr. Sudhir Bhat of Suyog Productions, cast him into a lead role in his comedy-drama "Bramhachari". That was what gave birth to his devotion and dedication to the world of Marathi theater & entertainment. He got his first break into films through the film "Pudhcha Paaul" by Producer Mr. Vinay Nevalkar which was directed by Mr. Raj Dutt and thus marked his first entry into the world of Marathi films, where his performance and name reached to a larger audience, further stabilizing his presence in the acting arena.

Having done a number of Marathi Stage shows, Prashant has also worked in the film media. He has worked in numerous television serials and more than a hundred Marathi films. He has worked with the big wigs of the industry and worked in some of the all-time famous movies like - Pasant Aahe Mulagi, Savat Majhi Ladki, Ekda Pahava Karun, Aatmavishwas, Ena Meena Deeka (along with Ashok Saraf), Madhuchandrachi Ratra, Vajwa Re Vajwa and the most recent Tu Tithe Mee.

He has acted in many Marathi and Hindi television serials and has portrayed memorable characters. Some of his works in television discipline are "Gharkul", "Be Dune Teen", "Bhikajirao Crorepati", "Gubbare", "Saare Saare Gaauya", "Kay Pahilas Majhyat", "Darling Darling", "Bahurupi" and the very popular, "Filmi Chakkar", "Uchapati", just to name a few of his most unforgettable performances.

Damle suffered a mild heart attack in May 2013. He was undergoing treatment at an Andheri hospital. Damle was admitted to the Critical H4 hospital after feeling uneasy. Angiography revealed four blockages in arteries supplying blood to his heart which was operated the same week. Damle was busy with "Eka Lagnachi Goshta" when he had this mild heart attack. Because of this, all shows of his dramas had to be canceled for the next 15 days. After the treatment, he again started doing plays but at a slower pace.

Other activities
He is doing a cookery show called as Aaj Kay Special on Colors Marathi. He also works as a brand ambassador for Disha Direct, Shamrao Vitthal Co-op. Bank Ltd. and of Retired Army Association. His TV Show Aamhi Saare Khavayye on Zee Marathi brings its audience, a set of delicious recipes. The show also gives the audience an opportunity to participate. Theme menus cater to all possible situations such as a weekend lunch menu, a party or whatever. One can learn to make starters, drinks, main course items as well as desserts on the show.

Prashant Damle Fan Foundation
Not only an actor and singer but he is also a renowned producer of theatre, through this, he started his own foundation called Prashant fan foundation through which he carries on his social work for the welfare of the society. He has also donated Rs 1 lakh for the water program of Maharashtra Govt.

Theatre 
Tur Tur
Maharastrachi Lokdhara
Moruchi Mavshi
Brahmachari
Lagnachi Bedi
Priti Sangam
Pahuna
Chal... Kahitarich Kay
Gela Madhav Kunikade
Lekure Udand Jhali
Priyatama
Be Dune Teen
Char Divas Premache
Shh... Kuthe Bolayche Nahi
Wyakti Ani Walli
Sundar Me Honaar
Sasu Majhi Dhasu
Eka Lagnachi Goshta
Aamhi Doghe Raja Rani
Jaadu Teri Najar
Bahurupi
Nakalat Disale Saare
Karti Kaljat Ghusali
Sangeet Sanshaykallol
Sakhar Khalella Manus
Eka Lagnachi Pudhachi Ghoshta
Sarkha Kahitari Hotay

He has completed his 11,000+ drama shows as of March, 2022

Filmography 

Mumbai-Pune-Mumbai 3 (2018) - Shekhar Pradhan (Gautam's father)
Mumbai-Pune-Mumbai 2 (2015) - Shekhar Pradhan (Gautam's father)
Bho Bho (2016)
Welcome Zindagi (2015)
Gola Berij (2012)
Tu tith me (2000)
Akka (1995)
Yadnya (1994)
Chal Gammat Karu (1994)
Gharandaj (1993)
Premankur (1993)
Garam Masala (1993)
Sarech Sajjan (1993)
Savat Mazi Ladki (1993) - Dr. Dinesh Kirtikar
Char Divas Sasuche (1993)
Bedardi (1993)
Vajwa Re Vajwa (1992)
Sagle Sarkech (1992)
Ek Gaganbhedi Kinkkali (1992)
Aikava Te Nawalach (1992)
Aapli Manase (1992)
Khulyacha Bajar (1992)
 Aayatya Gharat Gharoba (1991) - Ajay Sarpotdar
Atta Hoti Geli Kuthe (1991)
Dhadakmar (1991)
Bandalbaaj (1991)
Dhumakul (1990)
Fatfajiti (1990)
Baap Re Baap (1990)
Atmavishwas (1989) - Abhay Mangalkar
Pasant Aahe Mulgi (1989)
Ek Ratra Mantarleli (1989)
Eena Meena Deeka (1989)
Vidhilikhit (1989)
Aai Pahije (1988)
Reshim Gaathi (1988)
Saglikade Bomba Bomb (1988)
Anandi Anand (1987)
Olakh Na Palakh
Pudhcha Paaul

Television
Kay Pahilas Majhyat
Be Dune Paach
Uchapati
Ek Rupayachi Paij (DD Sahyadri)
Bhikaji Rao Crorepati (DD Sahyadri)
Hat Leka (Zee Marathi)
Aamchyasarkhe Aamhich (Zee Marathi)
Chandrakant Chiplunkar Seedi Bambawala (Sony SAB)

Reality Shows
Aamhi Saare Khavayye (Zee Marathi)
Sa Re Ga Ma Pa Season 11 (Zee Marathi)
Sahyadri Antakshari
Tak Dhi Naa Dhin
Aaj Kay special Season 1 (Colors Marathi)
Singing Star (Sony Marathi)
Kitchen Kallakar (Zee Marathi)

Awards received

Stage
1993: Best Actor, Natya Nirmata Sangh, Gela Madhav Kunikade
1993: Best Actor, Natydarpan award, Gela Madhav Kunikade
1993: Best Actor, Maharashtra State Award, Gela Madhav Kunikade
1995: Best Singer/Actor - 1995 - Kalnirnay, Lekure Udand Jhali
1995: Best Singer/Actor - 1995 - Akhil Bhartiya Natya Parishad, Lekure Udand Jhali
1995: Best Actor, Maharashtra State Award, Lekure Udand Jhali
1995: Best Actor, Critics Award, Lekure Udand Jhali
1996: RECORD BREAKER ACTOR, A special prize by Prabhat channel, ''1996: Best Actor, Natyadarpan Award, Priyatama1999: Best Actor, Natya Nirmata Sangh, Eka Lagnachi Gosht1999: Best Actor, ALFA Gaurav Puraskar, Eka Lagnachi Gosht1999: Best Actor, Akhil Bhartiya Natya Parishad, Eka Lagnachi Gosht1999: Best Actor, Maharashtra State Award, Eka Lagnachi Gosht2003: Best Actor, Kalaranjan Puraskar, pune, Amhi Doghe Raja Rani2003: Best Actor, Maharashtra State Award, Amhi Doghe Raja Rani2008: Best Actor, Maharashtra State Award, Olakh Na Palakh2010: Best Actor, Maharashtra State Award, Bahurupi2019: Best Actor, Lokmat Maharashtrian Of The Year, Eka Lagnachi Pudhchi GhostFilm
1993: Best Actor in a Supporting Role, Maharashtra State Award, Sawat Majhi Ladki''

Limca Records
Crossed the mark of 10,700 shows from 23rd Feb 1983 till date
Performed 5 shows of 3 different plays in one day on 18th Jan 2001
Performed 469 shows in 365 Days from 1st Jan. 1996 to 31st Dec. 1996
Performed 452 shows in 365 Days from 1st Jan. 1995 to 31st Dec. 1995
Performed 4 shows of 3 different plays in one day on 24th Dec. 1995

References

External links
 Official website
 IMDb

Living people
Indian theatre managers and producers
Marathi-language singers
Marathi playback singers
Male actors in Marathi theatre
Male actors in Marathi cinema
1961 births
Recipients of the Sangeet Natak Akademi Award